This is a list of genera of biological viruses. See also Comparison of computer viruses.

This is an alphabetical list of genera of biological viruses.  It includes all genera and subgenera of viruses listed by the International Committee on Taxonomy of Viruses (ICTV) 2019 report.

For a list of individual species, see List of virus species.
For a list of virus families and subfamilies, see List of virus families and subfamilies.
 For a list of virus realms, subrealms, kingdoms, subkingdoms, phyla, subphyla, classes, subclasses, orders, and suborders, see List of higher virus taxa.

Genera

A

Aalivirus
Aarhusvirus
Abbeymikolonvirus
Abidjanvirus
Abouovirus
Acadevirus
Acadianvirus
Acionnavirus
Actinovirus
Aegirvirus
Aerosvirus
Affertcholeramvirus
Agatevirus
Ageyesisatellite
Aghbyvirus
Agnathovirus
Agricanvirus
Agtrevirus
Ahduovirus
Ahphunavirus
Ahtivirus
Ailurivirus
Albetovirus
Alcyoneusvirus
Alefpapillomavirus
Alexandravirus
Alfamovirus
Allexivirus
Allolevivirus
Almendravirus
Alphaabyssovirus
Alphaarterivirus
Alphabaculovirus
Alphacarmotetravirus
Alphacarmovirus
Alphachrysovirus
Alphacoronavirus
Alphaendornavirus
Alphaentomopoxvirus
Alphafusellovirus
Alphaguttavirus
Alphainfluenzavirus
Alphaletovirus
Alphalipothrixvirus
Alphamesonivirus
Alphamononivirus
Alphanecrovirus
Alphanemrhavirus
Alphanodavirus
Alphanucleorhabdovirus
Alphanudivirus
Alphaovalivirus
Alphapapillomavirus
Alphapartitivirus
Alphapermutotetravirus
Alphapleolipovirus
Alphapolyomavirus
Alphaportoglobovirus
Alpharetrovirus
Alphasphaerolipovirus
Alphaspiravirus
Alphatectivirus
Alphatorquevirus
Alphatrevirus
Alphatristromavirus
Alphaturrivirus
Alphavirus
Amalgavirus
Amdoparvovirus
Amigovirus
Ampelovirus
Ampivirus
Ampullavirus
Ampunavirus
Anamdongvirus
Anaposvirus
Anativirus
Anatolevirus
Andhravirus
Andrewvirus
Andromedavirus
Anphevirus
Antennavirus
Anulavirus
Aokuangvirus
Aparavirus
Apdecimavirus
Aphroditevirus
Aphthovirus
Appavirus
Apricotvirus
Apscaviroid
Aquabirnavirus
Aqualcavirus
Aquamavirus
Aquambidensovirus
Aquaparamyxovirus
Aquareovirus
Arepavirus
Arequatrovirus
Aresaunavirus
Arlivirus
Armstrongvirus
Artiparvovirus
Arurhavirus
Ascovirus
Asfivirus
Ashivirus
Asteriusvirus
Atadenovirus
Atlauavirus
Attisvirus
Attoomivirus
Atuphduovirus
Aumaivirus
Aureusvirus
Aurivirus
Aurunvirus
Austintatiousvirus
Avastrovirus
Avenavirus
Aveparvovirus
Aviadenovirus
Avibirnavirus
Avihepadnavirus
Avihepatovirus
Avipoxvirus
Avisivirus
Avsunviroid
Avunavirus
Axomammavirus
Ayakvirus
Ayaqvirus

B

Babusatellite
Babuvirus
Bacillarnavirus
Badaguanvirus
Badnavirus
Bafinivirus
Baikalvirus
Baltimorevirus
Banchanvirus
Bandavirus
Bantamvirus
Baoshanvirus
Barbavirus
Barhavirus
Barnavirus
Barnyardvirus
Bastillevirus
Batrachovirus
Bavovirus
Baxtervirus
Baylorvirus
Bcepmuvirus
Bdellomicrovirus
Becurtovirus
Beetrevirus
Begomovirus
Beidivirus
Bellamyvirus
Bendigovirus
Benyvirus
Bequatrovirus
Berhavirus
Berlinvirus
Bernalvirus
Bertelyvirus
Betaarterivirus
Betabaculovirus
Betacarmovirus
Betachrysovirus
Betacoronavirus
Betaendornavirus
Betaentomopoxvirus
Betafusellovirus
Betaguttavirus
Betainfluenzavirus
Betalipothrixvirus
Betanecrovirus
Betanodavirus
Betanucleorhabdovirus
Betanudivirus
Betapapillomavirus
Betapartitivirus
Betapleolipovirus
Betapolyomavirus
Betaretrovirus
Betasatellite
Betasphaerolipovirus
Betatectivirus
Betatetravirus
Betatorquevirus
Betterkatzvirus
Bevemovirus
Bicaudavirus
Bidensovirus
Bielevirus
Bifilivirus
Bifseptvirus
Bignuzvirus
Bingvirus
Biquartavirus
Biseptimavirus
Bixzunavirus
Bjornvirus
Blattambidensovirus
Blosnavirus
Blunervirus
Bocaparvovirus
Bolenivirus
Bongovirus
Bonnellvirus
Boosepivirus
Bopivirus
Bostovirus
Botoulivirus
Botrexvirus
Botybirnavirus
Bovismacovirus
Bovispumavirus
Bowservirus
Bracovirus
Brambyvirus
Brevihamaparvovirus
Bridgettevirus
Brigitvirus
Britbratvirus
Brizovirus
Bromovirus
Bronvirus
Brujitavirus
Brunovirus
Brussowvirus
Bruynoghevirus
Bucovirus
Busanvirus
Buttersvirus
Bymovirus

C

Caeruleovirus
Cafeteriavirus
Caligrhavirus
Camvirus
Canoevirus
Capillovirus
Capistrivirus
Capripoxvirus
Capulavirus
Carbovirus
Cardiovirus
Cardoreovirus
Carlavirus
Carltongylesvirus
Caroctavirus
Carpasinavirus
Casadabanvirus
Catalunyavirus
Caulimovirus
Cavemovirus
Cbastvirus
Cecivirus
Ceduovirus
Ceetrepovirus
Celavirus
Centapoxvirus
Cepunavirus
Cequinquevirus
Certrevirus
Cervidpoxvirus
Cetovirus
Chakrabartyvirus
Chaphamaparvovirus
Charlievirus
Charybdisvirus
Charybnivirus
Chatterjeevirus
Chenonavirus
Cheoctovirus
Cheravirus
Cheungvirus
Chiangmaivirus
Chimshavirus
Chipapillomavirus
Chipolycivirus
Chivirus
Chlamydiamicrovirus
Chloriridovirus
Chlorovirus
Chordovirus
Chosvirus
Christensenvirus
Chunghsingvirus
Cilevirus
Cimpunavirus
Cinunavirus
Circovirus
Citexvirus
Citrivirus
Clavavirus
Clecrusatellite
Closterovirus
Clostunsatellite
Cocadviroid
Coccolithovirus
Coetzeevirus
Coguvirus
Colecusatellite
Coleviroid
Colossusvirus
Coltivirus
Comovirus
Coopervirus
Copiparvovirus
Coralvirus
Coriovirus
Corndogvirus
Cornellvirus
Corticovirus
Cosavirus
Cosmacovirus
Crahelivirus
Crinivirus
Cripavirus
Crocodylidpoxvirus
Crohivirus
Cronosvirus
Cronusvirus
Crustavirus
Cryspovirus
Cucumovirus
Cuernavacavirus
Cuevavirus
Cultervirus
Curiovirus
Curtovirus
Cyclitvirus
Cyclophivirus
Cyclovirus
Cymopoleiavirus
Cynoglossusvirus
Cypovirus
Cyprinivirus
Cystovirus
Cytomegalovirus
Cytorhabdovirus

D

Daemvirus
Daredevilvirus
Decapodiridovirus
Decurrovirus
Delepquintavirus
Deltaarterivirus
Deltabaculovirus
Deltacoronavirus
Deltaentomopoxvirus
Deltaflexivirus
Deltainfluenzavirus
Deltalipothrixvirus
Deltapapillomavirus
Deltapartitivirus
Deltapolyomavirus
Deltaretrovirus
Deltasatellite
Deltatorquevirus
Deltavirus
Demosthenesvirus
Dependoparvovirus
Derbicusvirus
Detrevirus
Dhakavirus
Dhillonvirus
Dianlovirus
Dianthovirus
Diatodnavirus
Dichorhavirus
Dicipivirus
Diegovirus
Dinodnavirus
Dinornavirus
Dinovernavirus
Dioscovirus
Diresapivirus
Dismasvirus
Divavirus
Doucettevirus
Douglaswolinvirus
Dragsmacovirus
Dronavirus
Drosmacovirus
Drulisvirus
Dyochipapillomavirus
Dyodeltapapillomavirus
Dyoepsilonpapillomavirus
Dyoetapapillomavirus
Dyoiotapapillomavirus
Dyokappapapillomavirus
Dyolambdapapillomavirus
Dyomupapillomavirus
Dyonupapillomavirus
Dyoomegapapillomavirus
Dyoomikronpapillomavirus
Dyophipapillomavirus
Dyopipapillomavirus
Dyopsipapillomavirus
Dyorhopapillomavirus
Dyosigmapapillomavirus
Dyotaupapillomavirus
Dyothetapapillomavirus
Dyoupsilonpapillomavirus
Dyoxipapillomavirus
Dyozetapapillomavirus

E

Eapunavirus
Eastlansingvirus
Ebolavirus
Eclunavirus
Edenvirus
Efquatrovirus
Eganvirus
Eiauvirus
Eisenstarkvirus
Elaviroid
Elerivirus
Elunavirus
Elvirus
Emalynvirus
Emaravirus
Emdodecavirus
Enamovirus
Eneladusvirus
Enhodamvirus
Enquatrovirus
Enterovirus
Entnonagintavirus
Entomobirnavirus
Entovirus
Ephemerovirus
Eponavirus
Epseptimavirus
Epsilonarterivirus
Epsilonpapillomavirus
Epsilonretrovirus
Epsilontorquevirus
Equispumavirus
Eracentumvirus
Eragrovirus
Erbovirus
Ermolevavirus
Errantivirus
Erskinevirus
Erythroparvovirus
Etaarterivirus
Etapapillomavirus
Etatorquevirus
Eurybiavirus
Eyrevirus

F

Fabavirus
Fabenesatellite
Fairfaxidumvirus
Farahnazvirus
Faunusvirus
Felipivirus
Felispumavirus
Felixounavirus
Felsduovirus
Feofaniavirus
Feravirus
Ferlavirus
Fibralongavirus
Fibrovirus
Ficleduovirus
Fijivirus
Finnlakevirus
Fipivirus
Fipvunavirus
Firehammervirus
Fischettivirus
Fishburnevirus
Flaumdravirus
Flavivirus
Fletchervirus
Foetvirus
Foturvirus
Foussvirus
Foveavirus
Franklinbayvirus
Friunavirus
Fromanvirus
Furovirus
Fussvirus

G

Gaiavirus
Gajwadongvirus
Galaxyvirus
Gallantivirus
Gallivirus
Galunavirus
Gamaleyavirus
Gammaarterivirus
Gammabaculovirus
Gammacarmovirus
Gammacoronavirus
Gammaentomopoxvirus
Gammainfluenzavirus
Gammalipothrixvirus
Gammanucleorhabdovirus
Gammapapillomavirus
Gammapartitivirus
Gammapleolipovirus
Gammapolyomavirus
Gammaretrovirus
Gammasphaerolipovirus
Gammatectivirus
Gammatorquevirus
Gamtrevirus
Gaprivervirus
Gelderlandvirus
Gemycircularvirus
Gemyduguivirus
Gemygorvirus
Gemykibivirus
Gemykolovirus
Gemykrogvirus
Gemykroznavirus
Gemytondvirus
Gemyvongvirus
Gequatrovirus
Gesputvirus
Getalongvirus
Getseptimavirus
Ghobesvirus
Ghunavirus
Giardiavirus
Giessenvirus
Gilesvirus
Gillianvirus
Globulovirus
Glossinavirus
Godonkavirus
Gofduovirus
Goodmanvirus
Goravirus
Gordonvirus
Gordtnkvirus
Gorganvirus
Gorjumvirus
Goslarvirus
Gosmusatellite
Goukovirus
Grablovirus
Gruhelivirus
Grusopivirus
Guelphvirus
Gustavvirus
Gutovirus
Gyeonggidovirus
Gyeongsanvirus
Gyrovirus

H

Haartmanvirus
Habenivirus
Hanrivervirus
Hapavirus
Hapunavirus
Harbinvirus
Harkavirus
Harrisonvirus
Hartmanivirus
Hawkeyevirus
Hedwigvirus
Heilongjiangvirus
Helsettvirus
Helsingorvirus
Hemiambidensovirus
Hemipivirus
Hemivirus
Hendrixvirus
Henipavirus
Hepacivirus
Hepanhamaparvovirus
Hepatovirus
Herbevirus
Herpetohepadnavirus
Hexartovirus
Higashivirus
Higrevirus
Hiyaavirus
Hollowayvirus
Holosalinivirus
Homburgvirus
Hongcheonvirus
Hoplichthysvirus
Hordeivirus
Horusvirus
Horwuvirus
Hostuviroid
Hpunavirus
Hubavirus
Hubramonavirus
Huchismacovirus
Hudivirus
Hudovirus
Hunnivirus
Hupolycivirus
Hypovirus

I

Iapetusvirus
Ichnovirus
Ichtadenovirus
Ichthamaparvovirus
Ictalurivirus
Idaeovirus
Idnoreovirus
Iflavirus
Igirivirus
Ikedavirus
Ilarvirus
Iltovirus
Ilzatvirus
Incheonvrus
Infratovirus
Infulavirus
Inhavirus
Inovirus
Invictavirus
Iodovirus
Ionavirus
Iotaarterivirus
Iotapapillomavirus
Iotatorquevirus
Ipomovirus
Iridovirus
Irtavirus
Isavirus
Iteradensovirus
Ithacavirus
Ixovirus

J

Jacevirus
Jalkavirus
Jarilovirus
Jasminevirus
Jedunavirus
Jeilongvirus
Jenstvirus
Jerseyvirus
Jesfedecavirus
Jiaodavirus
Jiaoyazivirus
Jilinvirus
Jimmervirus
Johnsonvirus
Jonvirus
Juiceboxvirus
Jwalphavirus

K

Kafavirus
Kafunavirus
Kagunavirus
Kairosalinivirus
Kajamvirus
Kakivirus
Kalppathivirus
Kanaloavirus
Kantovirus
Kaohsiungvirus
Kappaarterivirus
Kappapapillomavirus
Kappatorquevirus
Karamvirus
Kayfunavirus
Kayvirus
Kelleziovirus
Kelmasvirus
Kelquatrovirus
Kembevirus
Kieseladnavirus
Kilunavirus
Kirikabuvirus
Kisquattuordecimvirus
Kisquinquevirus
Kleczkowskavirus
Klementvirus
Kobuvirus
Kochikohdavirus
Kochitakasuvirus
Kojivirus
Kolesnikvirus
Korravirus
Kostyavirus
Kotilavirus
Koutsourovirus
Krakvirus
Krampusvirus
Krischvirus
Krylovvirus
Kryptosalinivirus
Kukrinivirus
Kunsagivirus
Kuravirus
Kusarnavirus
Kuttervirus

L

Labyrnavirus
Lacusarxvirus
Lagaffevirus
Lagovirus
Lambdaarterivirus
Lambdapapillomavirus
Lambdatorquevirus
Lambdavirus
Lanavirus
Laroyevirus
Laulavirus
Lauvirus
Ledantevirus
Lederbergvirus
Leishmaniavirus
Lentavirus
Lentinuvirus
Lentivirus
Lenusvirus
Leporipoxvirus
Lessievirus
Leucotheavirus
Levivirus
Libanvirus
Lidleunavirus
Liebevirus
Liefievirus
Lightbulbvirus
Likavirus
Lilyvirus
Limdunavirus
Limelightvirus
Limestonevirus
Limnipivirus
Lincruvirus
Lindendrivevirus
Lineavirus
Lingvirus
Lirvirus
Litunavirus
Livupivirus
Llyrvirus
Loanvirus
Locarnavirus
Loessnervirus
Lokivirus
Lolavirus
Lomovskayavirus
Longwoodvirus
Loriparvovirus
Lostrhavirus
Loudonvirus
Loughboroughvirus
Lubbockvirus
Luckybarnesvirus
Luckytenvirus
Ludopivirus
Lughvirus
Lullwatervirus
Luteovirus
Luzseptimavirus
Lwoffvirus
Lyctovirus
Lymphocryptovirus
Lymphocystivirus
Lyssavirus

M

Macanavirus
Macavirus
Machinavirus
Machlomovirus
Macluravirus
Macronovirus
Macropopoxvirus
Maculavirus
Maculvirus
Maenadvirus
Magadivirus
Magoulivirus
Majavirus
Malagasivirus
Mamastrovirus
Mammarenavirus
Mandarivirus
Manhattanvirus
Mapvirus
Marafivirus
Marburgvirus
Mardecavirus
Mardivirus
Marnavirus
Marseillevirus
Marthavirus
Marvinvirus
Mastadenovirus
Mastrevirus
Mavirus
Maxrubnervirus
Mazuvirus
Megabirnavirus
Megalocytivirus
Megrivirus
Mementomorivirus
Metaavulavirus
Metahepadnavirus
Metamorphoovirus
Metapneumovirus
Metavirus
Metrivirus
Mguuvirus
Mieseafarmvirus
Milvetsatellite
Mimasvirus
Mimivirus
Mimoreovirus
Miniambidensovirus
Minipunavirus
Minovirus
Minunavirus
Mischivirus
Mitovirus
Mivedwarsatellite
Mivirus
Mobatvirus
Mobuvirus
Moineauvirus
Molluscipoxvirus
Montyvirus
Mooglevirus
Moonvirus
Morbillivirus
Mosavirus
Mosigvirus
Mousrhavirus
Muarterivirus
Mudcatvirus
Mukerjeevirus
Mupapillomavirus
Mupivirus
Murciavirus
Muromegalovirus
Murrayvirus
Muscavirus
Mushuvirus
Mustelpoxvirus
Mutorquevirus
Muvirus
Mycoflexivirus
Mycoreovirus
Myohalovirus
Myrropivirus
Myunavirus
Myxoctovirus

N

Nacovirus
Naesvirus
Namakavirus
Nampongvirus
Nanhaivirus
Nankokuvirus
Nanovirus
Napahaivirus
Narmovirus
Narnavirus
Nazgulvirus
Nebovirus
Neferthenavirus
Negarvirus
Nepovirus
Neptunevirus
Nereusvirus
Nerrivikvirus
Nickievirus
Ningirsuvirus
Nipunavirus
Nitmarvirus
Nitunavirus
Nodensvirus
Nohivirus
Nonagvirus
Nonanavirus
Norovirus
Nouzillyvirus
Novirhabdovirus
Novosibovirus
Novosibvirus
Noxifervirus
Nuarterivirus
Nupapillomavirus
Nutorquevirus
Nyavirus
Nyceiraevirus
Nyfulvavirus
Nymphadoravirus

O

Obolenskvirus
Oengusvirus
Ohlsrhavirus
Oinezvirus
Okavirus
Okubovirus
Oleavirus
Omegapapillomavirus
Omegatetravirus
Omegavirus
Omikronpapillomavirus
Oncotshavirus
Oneupvirus
Ophiovirus
Orbivirus
Orchidvirus
Orinovirus
Orivirus
Orthoavulavirus
Orthobornavirus
Orthobunyavirus
Orthohantavirus
Orthohepadnavirus
Orthohepevirus
Orthonairovirus
Orthophasmavirus
Orthopneumovirus
Orthopoxvirus
Orthoreovirus
Orthorubulavirus
Orthotospovirus
Oryzavirus
Oryzopoxvirus
Oscivirus
Oshimavirus
Oslovirus
Ostreavirus
Otagovirus
Ourmiavirus

P

Paadamvirus
Pacuvirus
Pagavirus
Pagevirus
Paguronivirus
Pahexavirus
Pahsextavirus
Pairvirus
Pakpunavirus
Palaemonvirus
Pamexvirus
Panicovirus
Panjvirus
Papanivirus
Papyrusvirus
Paraavulavirus
Parabovirus
Parahepadnavirus
Parapoxvirus
Pararubulavirus
Parechovirus
Parhipatevirus
Pasivirus
Passerivirus
Patiencevirus
Pbi1virus
Pbunavirus
Peatvirus
Pecentumvirus
Pecluvirus
Pedosvirus
Peduovirus
Pefuambidensovirus
Pegivirus
Pegunavirus
Pekhitvirus
Pektosvirus
Pelagivirus
Pelamoviroid
Pelarspovirus
Pemapivirus
Penstylhamaparvovirus
Pepyhexavirus
Percavirus
Percyvirus
Perhabdovirus
Perisivirus
Peropuvirus
Pestivirus
Petsuvirus
Pettyvirus
Petuvirus
Phabquatrovirus
Phaeovirus
Phapecoctavirus
Phasivirus
Phayoncevirus
Phietavirus
Phifelvirus
Phikmvvirus
Phikzvirus
Phimunavirus
Phipapillomavirus
Phistoryvirus
Phitrevirus
Phlebovirus
Phutvirus
Phytoreovirus
Picardvirus
Picobirnavirus
Pidchovirus
Piedvirus
Pienvirus
Pifdecavirus
Pijolavirus
Pikminvirus
Pipapillomavirus
Pipefishvirus
Piscihepevirus
Plaisancevirus
Plasmavirus
Platypuvirus
Playavirus
Plectrovirus
Plotvirus
Poacevirus
Podivirus
Poecivirus
Pogseptimavirus
Poindextervirus
Pokrovskaiavirus
Polemovirus
Polerovirus
Pollyceevirus
Polybotosvirus
Polymycovirus
Pomovirus
Pontunivirus
Pontusvirus
Popoffvirus
Porprismacovirus
Poseidonvirus
Pospiviroid
Potamipivirus
Potexvirus
Potyvirus
Poushouvirus
Powvirus
Pradovirus
Prasinovirus
Pregotovirus
Primolicivirus
Priunavirus
Proboscivirus
Prosimiispumavirus
Protoambidensovirus
Protobacilladnavirus
Protoparvovirus
Prunevirus
Prymnesiovirus
Przondovirus
Psavirus
Psecadovirus
Pseudovirus
Psimunavirus
Psipapillomavirus
Pteridovirus
Pteropopoxvirus
Pulverervirus
Punavirus

Q

Qadamvirus
Qingdaovirus
Quadrivirus
Quaranjavirus
Quhwahvirus

R

Rabovirus
Radnorvirus
Rafivirus
Raleighvirus
Ranavirus
Raphidovirus
Rauchvirus
Ravavirus
Ravinvirus
Recovirus
Redivirus
Reginaelenavirus
Reptarenavirus
Reptillovirus
Rerduovirus
Respirovirus
Restivirus
Reyvirus
Rhadinovirus
Rhizidiovirus
Rhopapillomavirus
Rigallicvirus
Rimavirus
Ripduovirus
Risingsunvirus
Risjevirus
Robigovirus
Rogerhendrixvirus
Rogunavirus
Rohelivirus
Ronaldovirus
Ronavirus
Rosadnavirus
Rosavirus
Rosebushvirus
Rosemountvirus
Rosenblumvirus
Roseolovirus
Rotavirus
Roufvirus
Rowavirus
Roymovirus
Rtpvirus
Rubivirus
Rubodvirus
Rudivirus
Ruthyvirus
Rymovirus
Ryyoungvirus

S

Saclayvirus
Sadwavirus
Saetivirus
Sajorinivirus
Sakobuvirus
Salacisavirus
Salasvirus
Salemvirus
Salisharnavirus
Salivirus
Salmondvirus
Salmonivirus
Salmonpoxvirus
Salovirus
Salterprovirus
Samistivirus
Samunavirus
Samwavirus
Sanovirus
Sansavirus
Sapelovirus
Saphexavirus
Sapovirus
Sashavirus
Sasquatchvirus
Sasvirus
Sauletekiovirus
Saundersvirus
Sawastrivirus
Sawgrhavirus
Scapunavirus
Schiekvirus
Schizotequatrovirus
Schmidvirus
Schmittlotzvirus
Schnabeltiervirus
Schubertvirus
Scindoambidensovirus
Sciuripoxvirus
Sciuriunavirus
Sclerodarnavirus
Sclerotimonavirus
Scleroulivirus
Scoliodonvirus
Scottvirus
Scutavirus
Scuticavirus
Seadornavirus
Sectovirus
Sednavirus
Semotivirus
Senecavirus
Senquatrovirus
Seongnamvirus
Seoulvirus
Septimatrevirus
Sepunavirus
Sequivirus
Serkorvirus
Sertoctavirus
Seunavirus
Seuratvirus
Seussvirus
Sextaecvirus
Shalavirus
Shanbavirus
Shangavirus
Shapirovirus
Shaspivirus
Shenzhenvirus
Shilevirus
Shizishanvirus
Siadenovirus
Sicinivirus
Sieqvirus
Sigmapapillomavirus
Sigmavirus
Silviavirus
Simiispumavirus
Siminovitchvirus
Simpcentumvirus
Simplexvirus
Sinaivirus
Sinsheimervirus
Sirevirus
Sitaravirus
Skarprettervirus
Skunavirus
Slashvirus
Slopekvirus
Smoothievirus
Sobemovirus
Socyvirus
Sogarnavirus
Solendovirus
Sonalivirus
Sophoyesatellite
Sopolycivirus
Sortsnevirus
Soupsvirus
Sourvirus
Soymovirus
Spbetavirus
Spiromicrovirus
Sprivivirus
Sputnikvirus
Squashvirus
Sripuvirus
Staminivirus
Stanholtvirus
Steinhofvirus
Stockinghallvirus
Stompelvirus
Stompvirus
Stopalavirus
Stopavirus
Striavirus
Striwavirus
Stubburvirus
Stupnyavirus
Subclovsatellite
Subteminivirus
Sugarlandvirus
Suipoxvirus
Sukuvirus
Sunrhavirus
Sunshinevirus
Suspvirus
Suturavirus
Suwonvirus
Svunavirus
Symapivirus
Synodonvirus

T

Tabernariusvirus
Taipeivirus
Tamkungvirus
Tangaroavirus
Tankvirus
Tapwovirus
Taranisvirus
Taupapillomavirus
Tawavirus
Teetrevirus
Tefnutvirus
Tegunavirus
Telnavirus
Tenuivirus
Tepovirus
Tequatrovirus
Tequintavirus
Terapinvirus
Tertilicivirus
Teschovirus
Teseptimavirus
Tetraparvovirus
Thamnovirus
Thaumasvirus
Thetaarterivirus
Thetapapillomavirus
Thetatorquevirus
Thetisvirus
Thogotovirus
Thomixvirus
Thornevirus
Thottimvirus
Tiamatvirus
Tibrovirus
Tidunavirus
Tigrvirus
Tigunavirus
Tiilvirus
Tijeunavirus
Tilapinevirus
Timquatrovirus
Tinduovirus
Titanvirus
Tlsvirus
Tobamovirus
Tobravirus
Tombusvirus
Topocuvirus
Torbevirus
Torchivirus
Torovirus
Torradovirus
Tortellinivirus
Totivirus
Tottorivirus
Toursvirus
Toutatisvirus
Traversvirus
Treisdeltapapillomavirus
Treisepsilonpapillomavirus
Treisetapapillomavirus
Treisiotapapillomavirus
Treiskappapapillomavirus
Treisthetapapillomavirus
Treiszetapapillomavirus
Tremovirus
Triatovirus
Triavirus
Trichomonasvirus
Trichovirus
Trigintaduovirus
Trinavirus
Trinevirus
Trippvirus
Tritimovirus
Tritonvirus
Troedvirus
Tropivirus
Trungvirus
Tsarbombavirus
Tulanevirus
Tunavirus
Tunggulviirus
Tungrovirus
Tuodvirus
Tupavirus
Turncurtovirus
Turrinivirus
Twortvirus
Tymovirus

U

Uetakevirus
Uliginvirus
Umbravirus
Unahavirus
Unaquatrovirus
Unyawovirus
Upsilonpapillomavirus
Uukuvirus

V

Vaccinivirus
Valovirus
Varicellovirus
Varicosavirus
Vashvirus
Vectrevirus
Vegasvirus
Velarivirus
Vellamovirus
Vendettavirus
Vequintavirus
Versovirus
Vesiculovirus
Vesivirus
Vespertilionpoxvirus
Vespertiliovirus
Vhmlvirus
Vhulanivirus
Vicialiavirus
Vicosavirus
Victorivirus
Vidquintavirus
Vieuvirus
Villovirus
Vilniusvirus
Vipunavirus
Virtovirus
Vitivirus
Viunavirus
Vividuovirus
Voetvirus
Vojvodinavirus
Votkovvirus
Vulnificusvirus

W

Waewaevirus
Waikavirus
Wamavirus
Wanjuvirus
Warwickvirus
Wbetavirus
Weaselvirus
Webervirus
Wellingtonvirus
Wenrivirus
Whispovirus
Wifcevirus
Wildcatvirus
Wilnyevirus
Wilsonroadvirus
Winklervirus
Wizardvirus
Woesvirus
Woodruffvirus
Wphvirus
Wuhanvirus
Wuhivirus
Wumivirus

X

Xiamenvirus
Xipapillomavirus
Xipdecavirus
Xuanwuvirus
Xuquatrovirus
Xylivirus

Y

Yangvirus
Yatapoxvirus
Yingvirus
Yokohamavirus
Yoloswagvirus
Yuavirus
Yushanvirus
Yuyuevirus
Yvonnevirus

Z

Zarhavirus
Zeavirus
Zetaarterivirus
Zetapapillomavirus
Zetatorquevirus
Zetavirus
Zindervirus
Zybavirus

Subgenera

Ampobartevirus
Andecovirus
Aplyccavirus
Balbicanovirus
Behecravirus
Beturrivirus
Blicbavirus
Bosnitovirus
Brangacovirus
Buldecovirus
Casualivirus
Cegacovirus
Chibartevirus
Cholivirus
Colacovirus
Cradenivirus
Debiartevirus
Decacovirus
Dumedivirus
Duvinacovirus
Embecovirus
Enselivirus
Eurpobartevirus
Hanalivirus
Hedartevirus
Hepoptovirus
Herdecovirus
Hibecovirus
Igacovirus
Kadilivirus
Kaftartevirus
Karsalivirus
Kigiartevirus
Luchacovirus
Menolivirus
Merbecovirus
Micartevirus
Milecovirus
Minacovirus
Minunacovirus
Mitartevirus
Myotacovirus
Namcalivirus
Nobecovirus
Nyctacovirus
Ofalivirus
Pedacovirus
Pedartevirus
Pimfabavirus
Rebatovirus
Renitovirus
Rhinacovirus
Roypretovirus
Salnivirus
Sanematovirus
Sarbecovirus
Satsumavirus
Setracovirus
Sheartevirus
Snaturtovirus
Soracovirus
Stramovirus
Sunacovirus
Tegacovirus
Tilitovirus
Tipravirus
Wenilivirus
Xintolivirus

See also 

 List of virus families and subfamilies
 List of virus species
 List of virus taxa
 Table of clinically important viruses
 Virology
 Virus
 Virus classification
 Wikipedia:WikiProject Viruses
 WikiSpecies:Virus

References

L
Genera